The 1997 Skoda Czech Open was a women's tennis tournament played on outdoor clay courts at the I. Czech Lawn Tennis Club in Prague in the Czech Republic that was part of Tier IV of the 1997 WTA Tour. It was the sixth edition of the tournament and was held from 14 July through 20 July 1997. Unseeded Joannette Kruger won the singles title.

Finals

Singles

 Joannette Kruger defeated  Marion Maruska 6–1, 6–1
 It was Kruger's only singles title of the year and the 2nd and last of her career.

Doubles

 Ruxandra Dragomir /  Karina Habšudová defeated  Eva Martincová /  Helena Vildová 6–1, 5–7, 6–2
 It was Dragomir's 2nd title of the year and the 7th of her career. It was Habšudová's only title of the year and the 2nd of her career.

External links
 WTA tournament profile
 ITF tournament edition details

Skoda Czech Open
Prague Open
1997 in Czech tennis